The D.A.R. State Forest is a publicly owned forest with recreational features located mostly in the town of Goshen with some spillage into neighboring Ashfield, Massachusetts. Activities center around Upper and Lower Highland Lakes. The state forest encompasses  and is managed by the Department of Conservation and Recreation.

History
The forest was established in 1929 when  were donated to the state by the Daughters of the American Revolution. Improvements made in the 1930s by the Civilian Conservation Corps included the reconstruction of dams, the creation of camping and picnicking areas, and the building of roads and bridges.

Activities and amenities
The forest abuts Upper Highland and Lower Highland lakes, which provide opportunities for swimming, fishing, and non-motorized boating. The  of mixed-use trails that cross through the northern hardwood-conifer forest are used for hiking, mountain biking, and horseback riding. Camping is offered at 51 campsites. The Goshen fire tower provides views of the Connecticut River Valley and surrounding states. Winter activities include cross-country skiing, snowshoeing, snowmobiling, and ice fishing.

References

External links
DAR State Forest Department of Conservation and Recreation
DAR State Forest Map Department of Conservation and Recreation

Massachusetts state forests
Parks in Hampshire County, Massachusetts
Campgrounds in Massachusetts
Daughters of the American Revolution
Civilian Conservation Corps in Massachusetts
1929 establishments in Massachusetts